Methylophaga thalassica is an obligately methylotrophic, Gram-negative, strictly aerobic, motile, rod-shaped bacteria. Its type strain is ATCC 33146 (= NCMB 2163).

References

Further reading

External links

LPSN
Type strain of Methylophaga thalassica at BacDive -  the Bacterial Diversity Metadatabase

Piscirickettsiaceae
Bacteria described in 1985